Radiopaedia is a wiki-based international collaborative educational web resource containing a radiology encyclopedia and imaging case repository. It is currently the largest freely available radiology related resource in the world with more than 50,000 patient cases and over 16,000 reference articles on radiology-related topics. The open edit nature of articles allows radiologists, radiology trainees, radiographers, sonographers, and other healthcare professionals interested in medical imaging to refine most content through time. An editorial board peer reviews all contributions.

Background
Radiopaedia was started as a past-time project to store radiology notes and cases online by the Australian neuroradiologist Associate Professor Frank Gaillard in December 2005, while he was a radiology resident. He later became passionate in building the website and decided to release it on the web, advocating free dissemination of knowledge.

The domain name for radiopaedia.org was registered on 11 January 2007.

The Radiopaedia.org platform and text content are owned by Radiopaedia Australia Pty Ltd, a privately held company for which Gaillard is the chief executive officer. One of its investors is Investling and its revenue derives from ads, courses, and paid supporters. For image content, contributors reserve some rights and license the content to Radiopaedia and its users under a Creative Commons license.

The site was initially programmed using MediaWiki, the same program platform as Wikipedia, but now runs on a bespoke code written by TrikeApps.

In 2010, almost all of the article and image collection from radswiki (a similar wiki-based radiology educational site) was donated to Radiopaedia.

Its article content is currently limited to English.

Purpose
Radiopaedia’s mission is "to create the best radiology reference the world has ever seen and to make it available for free, for ever, for all."
Its intention is to benefit the radiology community and wider society and it relies on benevolent collaborations from radiologists and others with an interest in medical imaging.

Similarly to Wikipedia, registered users of the site are allowed to freely add and edit the majority of the content. This allows content to be progressively upgraded over years and for radiologists and society, in general, to continuously refine article content through time. The site also allows registered users to maintain their own personal case library of teaching cases. Rather than individually publishing articles, users are encouraged to integrate content with links to cases and journal articles and collaboratively refine content. In an attempt to reduce vandalism and to peer-review content, an editorial board moderates changes to ensure that the presented material is as accurate and relevant as possible. As with similar open edit sites, unreliability of content has been a concern; however, despite its open edit nature, it is ranked relatively high among user reviews.

A survey done in 2020 shows that 90% of on-call radiology trainees in the United States are using Radiopedia and StatDx as the first and second line options to help them during their work. Educational benefit was also demonstrated when integrating Radiopedia-based training in medical curriculum.

Sub sites
Radiopaedia also maintains several other educational subsites which include
Radiology Signs - a tumblr feed with selected signs
Radiology Channel - a YouTube channel containing educational videos

Editorial team
The editorial team, develop as well as help users to maintain the high-quality content of the website.

The current editorial board (2021) is composed of individuals from a variety of countries and includes:

Editor in chief
 Frank Gaillard

Academic director
 Andrew Dixon

Community director
 Jeremy Jones

Editorial director
 Henry Knipe

Managing editors
 Daniel J Bell
 Ian Bickle
 Andrew Murphy

iPhone, iPad and iOS apps

In 2009, the first Radiopaedia iPhone app was released. These teaching files package cases and articles for users to review and have sample questions and answers.
 Brain
 Gastrointestinal and hepatobiliary
 Musculoskeletal
 Paediatrics
 Chest
 Head and Neck

These have been released in two forms:
 LITE : 10 full cases
 FULL : 50–80 cases; the initial 50 have been supplemented in some cases.

Teaching files for the iPad were released in mid-2010. The first of its kind. These have currently been released for
 Brain
 Head and Neck
 Musculoskeletal

In 2012, Radiopaedia released a new version of its iOS application which is a universal app with in-app purchases for case packs.

Copyright
Most of the content is shared under a Creative Commons non-commercial license.

References

Encyclopedias of medicine
Medical websites